"Hey" is a debut single by Dutch singer-songwriter Fais featuring Dutch DJ Afrojack.

Music video
An accompanying music video for "Hey" was released on 26 February 2016 via Afrojack's channel, lengthening 4 minutes to 9 seconds.

Charts

Weekly charts

Year-end charts

Certifications

References

2016 singles
2016 songs
Afrojack songs